Thorpe Underwood is a hamlet in the civil parish of Harrington, in North Northamptonshire, England. In 1870-72 it had a population of 22. Thorpe Underwood was possibly a DMV.

References 

Hamlets in Northamptonshire
North Northamptonshire